Marine Renoir is a French actress and model.

She was the Internet muse of Louis Vuitton in the video "Taxi Encounters" in 2011 and play the lead part in music video "Mens-moi" by singer Merwan Rim.

Filmography

External links 

 

1987 births
Living people
French film actresses
Actors from Brest, France
French female models
21st-century French actresses